Calliotropis actinophora is a species of sea snail, a marine gastropod mollusk in the family Eucyclidae.

Description
The length of the shell measures 10 mm.

Distribution
This marine species occurs in the Gulf of Mexico, in the Caribbean Sea, the Lesser Antilles and in the Atlantic Ocean off Northern Brazil.

References

 Rosenberg, G., F. Moretzsohn, and E. F. García. 2009. Gastropoda (Mollusca) of the Gulf of Mexico, pp. 579–699 in Felder, D.L. and D.K. Camp (eds.), Gulf of Mexico–Origins, Waters, and Biota. Biodiversity. Texas A&M Press, College Station, Texas

External links
 

actinophora
Gastropods described in 1890